Nery Francisco Leyes (born 5 September 1989) is an Argentine footballer who plays for Gimnasia La Plata as a midfielder.

References

External links

1989 births
Living people
Association football midfielders
Argentine footballers
Argentine expatriate footballers
Argentine Primera División players
Torneo Federal A players
Chilean Primera División players
Talleres de Córdoba footballers
Defensa y Justicia footballers
Atlético Tucumán footballers
Newell's Old Boys footballers
C.D. Antofagasta footballers
Club Atlético Banfield footballers
Unión de Santa Fe footballers
Club de Gimnasia y Esgrima La Plata footballers
Expatriate footballers in Chile
Argentine expatriate sportspeople in Chile
People from Ushuaia